John William Poduska Sr. is an American engineer and entrepreneur. He was a founder of Prime Computer, Apollo Computer, and Stellar Computer. Prior to that he headed the Electronics Research Lab at NASA's Cambridge, Massachusetts, facility and also worked at Honeywell.

Poduska has been involved in a number of other high-tech startups.  He also has served on the boards of Novell, Anadarko Petroleum, Anystream, Boston Ballet, Wang Center and the Boston Lyric Opera.

Poduska was elected a member of the National Academy of Engineering in 1986 for technical and entrepreneurial leadership in computing, including development of Prime, the first virtual memory minicomputer, and Apollo, the first distributed, co-operating workstation.

Education 
Poduska was born in Memphis, Tennessee. In 1955, he graduated from Central High School in Memphis. He went on to earn a S.B. and S.M. in electrical engineering, both in 1960, from MIT.  He also earned a Sc.D. in EECS from MIT in 1962.

Awards 
 Recipient of the McDowell Award, National Academy of Engineering, 1986

References

External links 
 

1937 births
American computer businesspeople
American scientists
Computer hardware engineers
Living people
MIT School of Engineering alumni